WISE J014656.66+423410.0 (designation abbreviated to WISE 0146+4234) is a binary brown dwarf of spectral classes T9 and Y0 located in the constellation Andromeda. It is approximately 60 light-years from Earth.

Discovery
WISE 0146+4234 was discovered in 2012 by J. Davy Kirkpatrick et al. from data, collected by Wide-field Infrared Survey Explorer (WISE) Earth-orbiting satellite — NASA infrared-wavelength 40 cm (16 in) space telescope, which mission lasted from December 2009 to February 2011. In 2012 Kirkpatrick et al. published a paper in The Astrophysical Journal, where they presented discovery of seven new found by WISE brown dwarfs of spectral type Y, among which also was WISE 0146+4234.

Distance
The distance of WISE 0146+4234 was initially estimated to be 20 light-years from earth. Later measurements of its stellar parallax showed that it was actually 60 light-years away.

See also	
The other six discoveries of brown dwarfs, published in Kirkpatrick et al. (2012):
	
WISE 0350-5658 (Y1)
WISE 0359-5401 (Y0)
WISE 0535-7500 (≥Y1)
WISE 0713-2917 (Y0)
WISE 0734-7157 (Y0)
WISE 2220-3628 (Y0)

References

Brown dwarfs
Y-type stars
Andromeda (constellation)
WISE objects